Wayne Olholt (born August 1, 1951) was an American politician and farmer.

Olhoft was born in Wheaton, Minnesota. He lived in Herman, Minnesota and graduated from Herman High School in 1969. Olhoft was a farmer and served in the Minnesota National Guard. He received his bachelor's degree from Metropolitan State University in business and his master's degree in business administration from the University of Minnesota. Olhoft served in the Minnesota Senate from 1973 to 1982 and was a Democrat. He then served as the Minnesota Deputy Secretary of State in 2005.

References

1951 births
Living people
People from Grant County, Minnesota
People from Traverse County, Minnesota
Minnesota National Guard personnel
Farmers from Minnesota
Democratic Party Minnesota state senators